China's Super Consumers: What 1 Billion Customers Want and How to Sell It to Them is a 2014 nonfiction book by Savio S. Chan (陳少宏, Pinyin: Chén Shàohóng) and Michael A. Zakkour, published by John Wiley and Sons. The book discusses how U.S. businesses may market products to customers in mainland China.<ref name=Maher>Maher, Jack. "The Bling Dynasty by Erwan Rambourg and China’s Super Consumers by Savio Chan and Michael Zakkour." Asian Review of Books. December 2, 2014. Retrieved on May 26, 2015.</ref> Chan is the president and CEO of the consulting company US China Partners Inc., and Zakkour is a principal at Tompkins International, serving in its China/APAC sector.

Reception/Analysis

Jack Maher, a Princeton in Asia fellow, wrote in the Asian Review of Books that China's Super Consumers did not factor into account the anti-corruption drives of Xi Jinping and the increase of Chinese domestic brands, and both aspects would require Western companies to take additional cautions.

References

Further reading
 Fish, Eric. "Interview: How China's 'Super Consumers' Are Changing the World." Asia Society. February 11, 2015.
 "Co-Authors Discuss 'China's Super Consumers'." Asia Society. February 18, 2015. - Video
 Nawotka, Edward. "In Search of the Chinese Super Consumer." Publishing Perspectives. February 24, 2015.
 "CHINA’S SUPER CONSUMERS." Sinovision. October 6, 2014.
 China’s Super Consumers - ChinaFile, Asia Society

External links
 China's Super Consumers official website
 China's Super Consumers'' - John Wiley and Sons
 China's Super Consumers - Tompkins International

2014 non-fiction books
Books about China
Wiley (publisher) books
Business books